Nadiya Kazimirchuk-Fortunatova (born 27 September 1978) is a Ukrainian épée fencer, bronze medallist at the 2006 European Fencing Championships. She competed at the 2004 Summer Olympics, but lost in the first round to China's Zhang Li.

References

External links
 
 Profile at the European Fencing Confederation

1978 births
Living people
Ukrainian female épée fencers
Olympic fencers of Ukraine
Fencers at the 2004 Summer Olympics
Sportspeople from Kyiv
20th-century Ukrainian women
21st-century Ukrainian women